
Wałcz County is a unit of territorial administration and local government (powiat) in West Pomeranian Voivodeship, north-western Poland. It came into being on January 1, 1999, as a result of the Polish local government reforms passed in 1998.

As of 2006 its total population is 54,639, out of which the population of Wałcz is 26,140, that of Mirosławiec is 2,633, that of Człopa is 2,390, that of Tuczno is 1,965, and the rural population is 21,511.

Neighbouring counties
Wałcz County is bordered by Złotów County to the east, Piła County to the south-east, Czarnków-Trzcianka County to the south, Strzelce-Drezdenko County to the south-west, Choszczno County to the west and Drawsko County to the north-west.

Administrative division
The county is subdivided into five gminas (one urban, three urban-rural and one rural). These are listed in the following table, in descending order of population.

References
 Polish official population figures 2006

 
Land counties of West Pomeranian Voivodeship